The Fireclown may refer to:

The Fireclown, a 1965 science fiction novel by Michael Moorcock
Fireclown, a minor New Wave of British Heavy Metal (NWOBHM) band formed in 1979
"Fireclown", a song by NWOBHM group Tygers of Pan Tang